Marty Feier is an American drummer and music producer.  He is best known for his musician/producer role with 1313 Mockingbird Lane and for his work backing guitar pioneer Link Wray.  He also portrayed Ringo Starr while touring worldwide with The Cast of Beatlemania.

Career 
Marty Feier's career has spanned a diverse set of musical experiences and collaboration.

Link Wray 
Feier entered the public eye as the percussionist backing Link Wray on his albums Live in '85 (January 1986) and Born To Be Wild (1989), filling the spot vacated by Anton Fig.

Revolver 
Revolver was Feier's next project to release recorded tracks, an indie band formed in 1985.  Revolver's Scratch & Dent EP was released by Slinky Records, having been produced by Feier and engineered by Joe Blaney, who had done the same for The Clash's double platinum Combat Rock.  The album featured five original songs and a cover of "Gimme Gimme Good Lovin'", originally released by Crazy Elephant in the late 1960s.

1313 Mockingbird Lane 
An Albany, New York garage rock band with a name inspired by The Munsters television mansion address, 1313 Mockingbird Lane's drummer Steve E. Luv departed and was replaced by Marty Feier.  Feier soon added production to his role in the band's recordings.  Their second release, The Second Coming Of 1313 Mockingbird Lane (Scarab Records, 1989) was voted by regional news publications as one of the "top local recordings of 1989".  They would go on to release a full-length album together, Have Hearse Will Travel, in 1990 on Sundazed Records.

The band recently successfully completed a PledgeMusic campaign which resulted in the April 2015 Cacaphone Records re-release of the debut LP on vinyl, CD, and cassette, remastered with bonus tracks.

The Cast of Beatlemania 

Feier departed 1313 Mockingbird Lane for a full-time touring gig with The Cast of Beatlemania, which starred members of the successful Broadway show, Beatlemania.  The press noted that they weren't great lookalikes, but that they faithfully reproduced the sound and feel of The Beatles.  For these live performances, Feier donned a mop-top wig behind his 1965 Ludwig Black Oyster drum kit.

Still Got That Hunger 

In 2015, Feier was the executive producer of the album Still Got That Hunger by the band The Zombies. It was the band's first album since June 1969 to break into various Billboard top album charts.

Discography

Collaborators 

 1313 Mockingbird Lane
 Joe Blaney
 Tony Scherr
 Gary Windo
 Link Wray
 Howie Wyeth
 The Zombies

References

American rock drummers
Living people
1962 births
20th-century American drummers
American male drummers
20th-century American male musicians